Tetelbaum is surname, a modification of Yiddish Yiddish Teytlboym,  "Date palm". Notable people with the surname include:

Alexander Tetelbaum (born 1948), Ukrainian engineer
Ievgeniia Tetelbaum (born 1991), Israeli synchronized swimmer

See also 
 Teitelbaum

References

Jewish surnames